The South River is a tidal estuary, approximately  long in Carteret County, North Carolina in the United States.

It flows NNE and empties into the estuary of the Neuse River near its entrance into Pamlico Sound. The town of South River sits on western side near its mouth.

See also
List of North Carolina rivers

Rivers of Carteret County, North Carolina
Rivers of North Carolina
Estuaries of North Carolina
Tributaries of Pamlico Sound